Dittrichia graveolens, commonly known as stinkwort or stinking fleabane, is a plant species in the sunflower family, native to southern Europe, North Africa, and western Asia as far east as Pakistan. It has become naturalized in California, Asia, Africa, Australia, and other places and is regarded as a noxious weed in some regions. It is a classified as an invasive species in California, and a potential threat to wine production in the state.

Leaves are long and narrow, pointed at each end, with small teeth along the edges and glandular hairs on the surfaces. One plant can produce numerous yellow flower heads with as many as 16 ray florets and 40 disc florets.

Barbs on the fluffy-tipped seeds, which help it spread, can fatally damage the digestive systems of grazing animals. Oils in the plant also taint the flavor of meat and milk of animals that have consumed them. The sticky resin has been known to cause allergic reactions and severe dermatitis in humans. For this reasons, it is advisable to wear protective gloves when handling the plant.

References

External links

Dittrichia graveolens, Calflora taxon report, University of California
Dittrichia graveolens, California Invasive Plant Council
Dittrichia graveolens, United States Department of the Interior, Bureau of Land Management
Dittrichia graveolens, United States Department of Agriculture plants provile
Dittrichia graveolens Calphotos photo gallery, University of California @ Berkeley

Inuleae
Environment of the San Francisco Bay Area
Flora of North Africa
Flora of Europe
Flora of Asia
Plants described in 1755